The East Martinsburg Historic District is associated with the growth of Martinsburg, West Virginia during the 1850s, when the development of the Baltimore and Ohio Railroad brought German and Irish settlers to the area. The district includes areas known as Buena Vista, Chevally City, St. Vincent, Hooge's Addition, Small's Addition, Carver's Addition, Mohler's Addition, Strinesville and East Strinesville.

The oldest sections of the district have concentrations of pre-Civil War buildings in the Greek Revival style, while later sections include Gothic Revival, Queen Anne and Classical Revival buildings.

The district was listed on the National Register of Historic Places in 1980.

References

Neoclassical architecture in West Virginia
Federal architecture in West Virginia
Gothic Revival architecture in West Virginia
Greek Revival architecture in West Virginia
Historic districts in Martinsburg, West Virginia
Houses on the National Register of Historic Places in West Virginia
Queen Anne architecture in West Virginia
Houses in Martinsburg, West Virginia
Historic districts on the National Register of Historic Places in West Virginia